Fiddlers Three is a British sitcom series produced by Yorkshire Television for ITV which ran for 14 episodes from 19 February to 21 May 1991. Written by Eric Chappell and directed by Graham Wetherell, it stars Peter Davison as Ralph West, Paula Wilcox as Ros West, Charles Kay as J.J. Morley, Peter Blake as Harvey, Tyler Butterworth as Osborne and Cindy Marshall-Day as Norma.

The sitcom is about office politics in an accounts department in Wakefield, West Yorkshire.

It is a remake of Chappell's earliest sitcom, The Squirrels, broadcast from 1974 to 1977, excluding the scripts written by other writers.

Cast
Peter Davison as Ralph West
Paula Wilcox as Ros West
Charles Kay as J.J. Morley
Peter Blake as Harvey
Tyler Butterworth as Osborne
Cindy Marshall-Day as Norma

Episodes

References

External links

1991 British television series debuts
1991 British television series endings
1990s British sitcoms
1990s British workplace comedy television series
ITV sitcoms
Television series by ITV Studios
Television series by Yorkshire Television
English-language television shows
Television shows set in West Yorkshire